X-Rated: The Pop Videos They Tried to Ban was a 2004 British one-off television documentary examining controversial music videos.  It was first broadcast on Channel 4 on Sunday 24 July 2004 as part of the Channel 4 Banned season.

Videos featured

Duran Duran - "Girls on Film"
Frankie Goes to Hollywood - "Relax"
Marilyn Manson - "Coma White"
Madonna - "Like a Prayer"
Mötley Crüe - "Girls, Girls, Girls"
Sir Mix-a-Lot - "Baby Got Back"
Nine Inch Nails - "Happiness in Slavery"
Rockbitch - "Breathe"
Christina Aguilera - "Dirrty"
Aphex Twin - "Come to Daddy"
The Prodigy - "Smack My Bitch Up"
Placebo - "Protège-Moi"
Ultravox - "Visions in Blue"
The Bloodhound Gang - "The Ballad of Chasey Lain"

References

External links

Channel 4 original programming
British television documentaries
Censorship of broadcasting
2004 television specials